Pietro Freschi (6 August 1906, in Piacenza – 16 October 1973) was an Italian rower who competed in the 1928 Summer Olympics.

In 1928 he was part of the Italian boat, which won the bronze medal in the coxless four event.

References

External links
 profile

1906 births
1973 deaths
Sportspeople from Piacenza
Italian male rowers
Olympic rowers of Italy
Rowers at the 1928 Summer Olympics
Olympic bronze medalists for Italy
Olympic medalists in rowing
Medalists at the 1928 Summer Olympics
European Rowing Championships medalists